Michaelophorus margaritae is a species of moth in the genus Michaelophorus known from Ecuador. The specific name refers to Margarita Pelz, the wife of the collector of the species.

References

Platyptiliini
Moths described in 2006
Endemic fauna of Ecuador
Moths of South America